Time for Timer is a series of seven short public service announcements broadcast on Saturday mornings on the ABC television network starting in 1975. The animated spots feature Timer, a tiny cartoon character who represents the sense of time in the human body. Timer was in charge of when a person felt it was time to eat, time to sleep, etc. He carried a large pocket watch inside of him that set off an alarm whenever something was about to happen.

Usually wearing a bow tie and top hat, Timer looks like a little yellow meatball with a face and has long slender arms and legs. Timer has limited magical powers, such as teleportation, which he uses to exit his host's body from time to time. A wisecracker as well as a song-and-dance man, Timer promotes healthy eating and personal hygiene for children using clever songs and animation.

The series was produced by the cartoon studio DePatie-Freleng Enterprises. Timer first appears in the 1973 ABC Afterschool Special "The Incredible, Indelible, Magical, Physical Mystery Trip", where he was voiced by Len Maxwell. Except for this 1973 portrayal, Timer's voice was provided by actor Lennie Weinrib. Timer also appears in the 1974 ABC Afterschool Special "The Magical Mystery Trip Through Little Red's Head". In "Physical Mystery Trip", he works inside the body of a man named Uncle Carl; in "Little Red", he works inside a teenaged Red Riding Hood.

Time for Timer ran concurrently and interchangeably until 1992 with ABC's other educational spots, primarily The Bod Squad and Schoolhouse Rock!. They generally appeared during cartoon programs at the end of commercial breaks. The shorts included a Consultant credit for Dr. Roslyn B. Alfin-Slater, UCLA School of Public Health.

Episodes
 "I Hanker Fer a Hunk O Cheese" - Timer, recast as a cowboy with a thick Western accent, suggests "wagon wheels", sandwiches made with cheese slices and crackers, as an easy and nutritious snack. When Timer prepares one on a kitchen counter, he rolls it down the counter on its edge and exclaims, "Look! A wagon wheel!"
 "Take Care of Yourself" - Timer shows how to brush teeth to protect them from cavities.
 "You Are What You Eat" - Roving reporter Timer is at the digestive system to provide a simplified explanation of nutrients and how the body uses them.
 "Have A Carrot" - Timer, channeling W. C. Fields, assembles some nutritious in-between meal snacks like carrot sticks for a boy. At the end of the short, Timer literally changes the boy into a banana as a gag.
 "Eat Some Kind of Breakfast" - Timer shows that if people don't have time for breakfast, their stomach will be empty and angry; leftovers and other premade foods for breakfast is better than none at all.
 "Sunshine on a Stick" - Timer suggests making ice pops with fruit juice, an ice tray, and toothpicks.
 "Don't Knock It Till You Try" - Timer suggests trying new foods by eating a smorgasbord of smidgens of different foods.

References

External links
 
 
 Bio of Dr. Roslyn B. Alfin-Slater, UCLA nutrition professor and consultant to Time for Timer 

American Broadcasting Company original programming
Interstitial television shows
Public service announcements of the United States
Television series segments